The Channings is a 1920 British silent crime film directed by Edwin J. Collins and starring Lionelle Howard, Dick Webb and Dorothy Moody. It was based on the 1862 novel The Channings by Ellen Wood.

Cast
 Lionelle Howard ...  Arthur Channing 
 Dick Webb ...  Hamish Channing 
 Dorothy Moody ...  Constance Channing 
 Cowley Wright ...  Roland Yorke 
 Charles Vane ...  Huntley 
 Frank Arlton ...  Galloway

References

External links

1920 films
1920 crime films
British crime films
Films directed by Edwin J. Collins
Films based on British novels
British silent feature films
British black-and-white films
1920s English-language films
1920s British films